Versus Debates was a series of online debates created by Intelligence Squared and Google using Google Plus' +Hangout technology. The first debate was in March 2012, titled "It's time to end the War on Drugs".

Season 1
The first season of Versus was begun on 13 March 2012 with the debate "It's time to end the War on Drugs", featuring Richard Branson, Russell Brand, Antonio Maria Costa, Eliot Spitzer, Geoffrey Robertson QC, Fernando Cardoso and Julian Assange.
The second Versus event was "Hip-hop doesn't enhance society, it degrades it". Q-Tip, KRS-One, Jesse Jackson, Jason Whitlock, dream hampton and more debated the politics of hip-hop to a hall of 2,000 and an online audience of 80,000.

References

Debates
Google